HMS Britannia was a 120-gun first-rate ship-of-the-line of the Royal Navy, laid down in 1813 and launched on 20 October 1820.

Commissioned in 1823, she saw service in the Mediterranean from 1830-1 and in 1841. She was decommissioned in 1843, before returning to service for the Crimean War, serving as flagship of Admiral Sir James Deans Dundas, commanding the British fleet in the Mediterranean and Black Sea from 1851–4.. She was engaged in the Bombardment of Sebastopol on  17 October 1854 during the Crimean War. On 14 November 1854, she was driven ashore on the Russian coast and was reported to have  of water in her hold.

She returned to England at the beginning of 1855 and that year became a hospital ship at Portsmouth, then a cadet training ship in 1859. She was moved to Portland in 1862, then Dartmouth in 1863, where she served as residential barracks for cadets.

She was finally sold for breaking up in 1869. Her place at Dartmouth was taken by HMS Prince of Wales, which was renamed Britannia for the role.

Generations of naval officers had their first taste of the navy aboard the two Britannias. Alumni included John Fisher, Percy Scott, John Jellicoe, Roger Keyes, William Boyle, Augustus Agar and King George V.

Notes

References

Lavery, Brian (2003) The Ship of the Line - Volume 1: The development of the battlefleet 1650-1850. Conway Maritime Press. .
Lyon, David and Winfield, Rif (2004) The Sail and Steam Navy List: All the Ships of the Royal Navy 1815-1889. Chatham Publishing, London. .
Duckers, Peter (2011) The Crimean War at Sea: The Naval Campaigns against Russia, 1854-56. Pen & Sword Maritime. .

External links
 
 The Dreadnought Project

Ships of the line of the Royal Navy
Ships built in Plymouth, Devon
Caledonia-class ships of the line
Hospital ships of the Royal Navy
1820 ships
Crimean War naval ships of the United Kingdom
Maritime incidents in November 1854